Michael Babatunde Adeyinka Also known as DJ Tunez is a Nigeria and USA based disc jockey.
In 2015, DJ Tunez was asked by Wizkid to join Starboy Entertainment, as the official label DJ, DJ Tunez first production was in 2016's Iskaba, a contagious hit song with Wande Coal. 
He has collaborated with other acts such as Wizkid, Sarz, Burna Boy, Busiswa, Reekado Banks, Damibliz, Omah Lay and many more.

Early life
Michael Babatunde Adeyinka was born in Brooklyn Long Island Hospital, New York, USA.
His dream began after DJing his local church's Christmas parties as a teen. This eventually grew into paid gigs DJing church members’ events such as birthday parties and weddings.
His African community in South Brooklyn began to take a fancy to his ability to play music with an afrobeats and dancehall inspired atmosphere to audience, the little attention encouraged him to throw parties around the city.

Career
In 2016 DJ Tunez collaborated with Wande Coal to dish out what Okayafrica described as Nigeria 2nd Best song of 2017.
In 2019 DJ Tunez released a single featuring Wizkid titled "Gbese", "Turn Up" Featuring Wizkid & Reekado Banks, with supplementary vocals from Rema.
DJ Tunez event, a Black Friday “Blackout” party, brought about 1,700 people to Queens’ Amazura Concert Hall in November 2019.

Featured as a guest panelist at a business forum held at Columbia University in 2019, Michael Babatunde Adeyinka Also known as DJ Tunez joined other leaders in the music industry to discuss the business of art and literature on the African continent. The panel was moderated by special guest design and technology executive Olufeko.

Discography

Selected singles
 "Glow" (feat. Iyanya & Khago) 2014
 "Your Body" (One Dance Refix feat. Wande Coal)  2016
 "Cotton Candy"  (DJ Tunez and Leriq) feat. Burna Boy 2017
 "My Love" (feat. Adekunle Gold & Del B)
 "Get Up" (feat. Flash & Sarz)
 "Iskaba" (feat. Wande Coal)
 "Cover Me" (Starboy feat. Wizkid   2019
"Late Night" (feat. Yxng Bane)
 "Gbese" (feat. Wizkid)  2019.
 "Turn Up" (feat. Wizkid & Reekado Banks) 2018.
 "Oshe" (feat. Juls) 2018
 "Too Much" (feat. Flash).
 "Causing Trouble" (feat. Oxlade) 2019
 "Paloma" (feat. Alpha P. & D3AN Remix) 2020
 "Majesty" (feat. Busiswa) 2019
 "Kelegbe Megbe" (Remix) · 2020
 "Enjoyment"  (feat. Kwamz & Flava) 2020
 "Hello Esther" (feat. Ice Prince) 2019
 "Pepesu" (feat. Dotman) 2018
 "Cool Me Down" (feat Wizkid) 2020
 "Pami" (feat Wizkid , Adekunle Gold & Omah Lay) 2020

Award & Nominations
He has received many Accolades and Nominations,

References

Living people
Nigerian hip hop DJs
Nigerian record producers
Musicians from Lagos State
Yoruba musicians
Year of birth missing (living people)